Clarence Hylan Beavers (June 12, 1921 – December 4, 2017) was an American United States Army sergeant and paratrooper who served with the first all-black airborne unit, the 555th Parachute Infantry Battalion, during World War II.  He was part of the groundbreaking group of black paratroopers assigned to the 555th Parachute Infantry Battalion also known as the "Triple Nickles" and later "Smoke Jumpers" at Fort Benning in Georgia.

During the 1940s, army posts in the south were largely segregated. Beavers later told stories about how members of the unit were not allowed to use the post exchange or mess hall, a privilege even Italian and German prisoners of war being held there were allowed.

The unit served stateside, mostly on the West Coast, protecting against Japanese fire balloons, which were described as the world’s first intercontinental-range airborne weapons — giant bomb-laden balloons launched from Japan and aimed at North America.

Beavers died on December 4, 2017 at his home in Huntington, Long Island of a coronary related illness. He was 96 and interred at Calverton National Cemetery.

References 

Paratroopers
African Americans in World War II
1921 births
2017 deaths
Military personnel from New York City
United States Army personnel of World War II
African-American United States Army personnel